The Desberon was an American automobile manufactured from 1901 until 1904.  The company initially built steam trucks, and later branched out into making 4 hp gas-driven "pleasure carriages" built along "French lines".  Later still, 6·2 liter 12 hp models were produced.

References
David Burgess Wise, The New Illustrated Encyclopedia of the Automobile

Defunct motor vehicle manufacturers of the United States